Karen Bakker is a Canadian author, researcher, and entrepreneur known for her work on digital transformation, environmental governance, and sustainability. A Rhodes Scholar with a PhD from Oxford, Bakker is a professor at the University of British Columbia. In 2022–2023 she will be on sabbatical leave at Harvard, as a Harvard Radcliffe Institute Fellow. She is the recipient of numerous awards, including a Guggenheim Fellowship, Stanford University's Annenberg Fellowship in Communication, Canada's "Top 40 Under 40", and a Trudeau Foundation Fellowship.

Bakker's current research focuses on the intersection of digital technologies and environmental governance, digital environmental humanities, digital geographies, political ecology, and political economy. In the early part of her career, she focused on water and climate issues. More recently, she has begun focusing on digital tech and environmental futures studies: critical yet pragmatic projects that advance regenerative sustainability and environmental justice.

Career
Trained in both the natural and social sciences (a combined Bachelor of Arts and Science (minor in Physics), followed by a PhD in global environmental change), Bakker has published over 100 academic publications, including seven sole-authored and edited scholarly books. Her work has been cited over 16,000 times.

She has also served as a policy advisor to organizations at the forefront of digital innovation on environmental issues, including the Digital Research Alliance of Canada, Future Earth, Sustainability in a Digital Age, and the International Institute for Sustainable Development. Her advisory roles have also included the IPCC, National Round Table on Environment and Economy, OECD, UNDP, UNEP, UNESCO, and OHCHR.

Currently, Bakker is a member of the Decolonizing Water research collective and the Riverhood project team (funded by the EU), as well as the Coalition on Digital Environmental Sustainability, and the Policy Network on Environment of the Internet Governance Forum.  She is also a board member of the National Research Council Canada, and a member of the editorial board of Global Environmental Change

Bakker has delivered over 200 conference presentations and invited lectures over the course of her career, at institutions such as Berkeley, Harvard, Stanford, and UCLA. These span several disciplines including geography and environmental studies, computer science, urban studies, labour studies, political ecology, and political economy.

Digital transformation and sustainability: The Smart Earth Project
Bakker's Smart Earth project engages with two of the most destabilizing, controversial trends of our time: digital transformation and global environmental change.

Smart Earth brings together researchers, educators, and policymakers to study environmental knowledge and seeks to better understand the complex relationships between humans and nature. This project was launched with a meta-review of a smart technologies database in 2018. Bakker maintains a website with learning tools regarding digital technologies and their application to environmental issues, and has collaborated with the United Nations Environment Program to map out a roadmap for international action on digital transformation and sustainability.

Interspecies communication and bioacoustics
Bakker has worked at the intersection of data and sustainability, exploring how technology can be leveraged to better protect, understand, cohabitate, and perhaps even communicate with our non-human counterparts. In The Sounds of Life, due to be published in October 2022 with Princeton University Press, she explores these topics in detail. Bakker has also written critically about the potential pitfalls of the digital listening agenda, comparing it to an environmental variant of surveillance capitalism.

The Sounds of Life
In October 2022, Bakker published her latest book: The Sounds of Life: How Digital Technology is Bringing Us Closer to the Worlds of Animals and Plants (Princeton University Press). The book was chosen as the NPR Science Friday Book Club book of the month for November 2022, selected as one of Malcolm Gladwell's Next Big Idea Club nominees in October 2022, and received both popular and critical acclaim, including a review in Science, which described the book as "thoughtful and rigorous…meticulously researched and colorfully presented…in a way that is accessible to non-experts. A wonderful mix of animal ecology, narratives of science-doing, futurism, and accounts of Indigenous knowledge that is as interdisciplinary as the field itself."

Water governance
Bakker has worked broadly on issues of water accessibility, governance, and policy. Her publications include Privatizing Water: Governance Failure and the World's Urban Water Crisis (Cornell University Press), An Uncooperative Commodity: Privatizing Water in England and Wales (Oxford University Press), "Neoliberalizing Nature? Market Environmentalism in Water Supply in England and Wales" (2005), and "Water security: Debating an emerging paradigm" (2012).

As Karen Le Billon
Writing under her nom de plume, Karen Le Billon, Bakker has written two popular science books on children, food, and families. French Kids Eat Everything (HarperCollins, 2012) was published in 15 countries and 12 languages, awarded the Taste Canada Food Writing Award in 2013, and widely featured in the press, including The New York Times, The Guardian, and The Sunday Times.

Notable Works

Books
The Sounds of Life (Princeton University Press, 2022) .
Water Teachings, K. Bakker and C. Crane (eds) (2020)
Privatizing Water: Governance Failure and the World's Urban Water Crisis (Cornell University Press, 2010)  . Awarded: Urban Affairs Association Book Award (2011; honourable mention) and the Rik Davidson/Studies in Political Economy Book Prize (2012)
An Uncooperative Commodity: Privatizing Water in England and Wales (Oxford University Press, 2004) .

Chapters and Articles (Peer-Reviewed)

References

External links 
 Official website
 Smart Earth Project
 Water Governance Project
 Official UBC Profile

Year of birth missing (living people)
Living people
Sustainability scientists
21st-century Canadian women writers
Academic staff of the University of British Columbia
Canadian women academics
McMaster University alumni
Canadian Rhodes Scholars